Job 41 is the 41st chapter of the Book of Job in the Hebrew Bible or the Old Testament of the Christian Bible. The book is anonymous; most scholars believe it was written around 6th century BCE. This chapter records the speech of God to Job, which belongs to the "Verdicts" section of the book, comprising Job 32:1–42:6.

Text
The original text is written in Hebrew language. This chapter is divided into 34 verses in English Bibles, but only 26 verses in Hebrew Bible using a different verse numbering (see below).

Verse numbering
There are some differences in verse numbering of this chapter in English Bibles and Hebrew texts:

This article generally follows the common numbering in Christian English Bible versions, with notes to the numbering in Hebrew Bible versions.

Textual witnesses
Some early manuscripts containing the text of this chapter in Hebrew are of the Masoretic Text, which includes the Aleppo Codex (10th century), and Codex Leningradensis (1008).

There is also a translation into Koine Greek known as the Septuagint, made in the last few centuries BC; some extant ancient manuscripts of this version include Codex Vaticanus (B; B; 4th century), Codex Sinaiticus (S; BHK: S; 4th century), and Codex Alexandrinus (A; A; 5th century).

Analysis
The structure of the book is as follows:
The Prologue (chapters 1–2)
The Dialogue (chapters 3–31)
The Verdicts (32:1–42:6)
The Epilogue (42:7–17)

Within the structure, chapter 41 is grouped into the Verdict section with the following outline:
Elihu's Verdict (32:1–37:24)
God's Appearance (Yahweh Speeches) and Job's Responses (38:1–42:6)
God's First Speech (38:1–40:2)
Theme Verse and Summons (38:1–3)
The Physical World (38:4–38)
The Physical Earth (38:4–7)
The Sea (38:8–11)
The Morning (38:12–15)
The Outer Limits of the Earth (38:16–18)
Light and Darkness (38:19–21)
The Waters – Snow, Hail, Rain, Frost, Ice (38:22–30)
The Heavenly Bodies (38:31–33)
Storms (38:34–38)
The Animal World (38:39–40:2)
God Provides for the Lions and Ravens (38:39–41)
The Mountain Goats (39:1–4)
The Wild Donkey (39:5–8)
The Wild Ox (39:9–12)
The Ostrich (39:13–18)
The Warhorse (39:19–25)
The Hawk and the Eagle (39:26–30)
Brief Challenge to Answer (40:1–2)
Job's First Reply – An Insufficient Response (40:3–5)
God's Second Speech (40:6–41:34)
Theme Verse and Summons (40:6–8)
The Challenge Expanded (40:9–14)
The Challenge of Controlling Behemoth (40:15–24)
Leviathan (41:1–34)
The Challenge to Contend with Leviathan (41:1–7)
Some Conclusions (41:8–11)
His Armor (41:12–17)
His Breathing. of Fire (41:18–21)
His Strength (41:22–25)
Weapons Cannot Defeat Him (41:26–29)
He Creates Turmoil (41:30–32)
Conclusion (41:33–34)
Job's Second Reply (42:1–6)

God's speeches in chapters 38–41 can be split in two parts, both starting with almost identical phrases and having a similar structure:

The revelation of the Lord to Job is the culmination of the book of Job, that the Lord speaks directly to Job and displays his sovereign power and glory. Job has lived through the suffering—without cursing God, holding his integrity, and nowhere regretted it – but he was unaware of the real reason for his suffering, so God intervenes to resolve the spiritual issues that surfaced. Job was not punished for sin and Job’s suffering had not cut him off from God, now Job sees the end the point that he cannot have the knowledge to make the assessments he made, so it is wiser to bow in submission and adoration of God than to try to judge him.

Chapter 41 continues YHWH's second speech with the focus on the sea creature Leviathan. The chapters consists of two sections:
A challenge to Job to contend with Leviathan (verses 1–11)
An extended description of Leviathan's features (verses 12–34)

God challenges Job to contend with Leviathan (41:1–11)
The section opens with a series of questions to challenge Job to contend with Leviathan, which is quite overpowering for humans. The human challenge against Leviathan is described as futile (verses 8–10a), so the implication is "who can stand before" YHWH who created Leviathan (verse 10b).

Verse 1
[YHWH said:] "Can you draw out Leviathan with a hook,
Or snare his tongue with a line which you lower?"
"Leviathan": a large sea creature with unknown exact identity. The defeat of Satan in Revelation 12:3–9 is depicted with the same kind of imagery as Leviathan.
"Draw out": translated from the Hebrew verb , mashakh, meaning "to extract from the water; to fish".
"Lower": translated from the Hebrew verb , shaqaʿ, meaning "to cause to sink", if it is connected with the word in Amos 8:8 and 9:5. It may also have the sense of "to tie; to bind", that is 'using rope to put (bind tightly) around the tongue and jaw'.

God speaks more of Leviathan (41:12–34)
After an introductory statement (verse 12), God speaks more extensively on the Leviathan: its armor (verses 13–17), fire breathing (verses 18–21), strength (verses 22–25), inability of weapons to defeat it (verses 26–29), the turmoil it creates (verses 30–32) and a general conclusion (verses 33–34). It is out of question for human to control this creature (whether natural or symbolic of the forces of evil and chaos), but it needs to be controlled for the creation to continue and God has the control of it and all the creatures to order the world. Therefore God's rule is more than Job can imagine and more nuanced that simply rewarding righteousness or punishing wickedness.

Verse 22

[YHWH said:] "In his neck abides strength,
and terror dances before him."

See also

Related Bible parts: Job 38, Job 39, Job 40, Psalm 74, Psalm 104, Isaiah 27

References

Sources

External links
 Jewish translations:
 Iyov - Job - Chapter 41 (Judaica Press) translation [with Rashi's commentary] at Chabad.org
 Christian translations:
 Online Bible at GospelHall.org (ESV, KJV, Darby, American Standard Version, Bible in Basic English)
 Book of Job Chapter 41. Various versions
  Various versions

41